Saqib Mahmood (born 24 August 1977) played first-class cricket for Somerset in 1999. He was born at Kettering, Northamptonshire.

Mahmood was a right-handed lower-order batsman and a right-arm leg-break bowler. Having played for Essex's second eleven in 1997 and 1998, he joined Somerset, but appeared in only one first-class match. Against the 1999 New Zealanders he batted at No 11 and scored an unbeaten seven in the first innings and was out without scoring in the second innings; his bowling was unfortunate, and his two overs in the first innings went for 34 runs, including six no-balls, while his single over in the New Zealanders' second innings had nine runs scored from it. He did not play for Somerset again.

References

1977 births
Living people
English cricketers
Somerset cricketers